Mehmet Ali Bey was an Ottoman government minister, who was one of the last former Minister of the Interior of the Ottoman Empire. He was the son of Kamil Pasha, and Hafize Hanım. He was married with Eleanor Louisa Bendon from Great Britain.

Mehmet Ali Bey, intended to be a non-partisan organization in the beginning of the founders of the Committee (1918). A short time later, Freedom and Accord Party, again took part in team activities striving to win (1919). The British Friendship Society in 1920 was elected to honorary. After the proclamation of the Republic, he was deported along with other 150 personae non gratae of Turkey. He lived from 1924 until 1938 in exile in Paris, where he began to publish a newspaper with the name Chained Republic. The first issue of the newspaper in 1930, critique Mustafa Kemal Atatürk. Four days before Mustafa Kemal Atatürk death in 1938, Mehmed Ali taking advantage of the amnesty law, and was returned to Turkey together with his Family. He take the adopted surname "Gerede" after the 1934 Surname Law, which required all Turkish citizens to adopt a surname.

Mehmet Ali Bey died in Istanbul on October 16, 1939.

1939 deaths
Politicians from Istanbul